PNF may refer to:

 National Fascist Party (Partito Nazionale Fascista), Italy
 Nature Park of Faial (Portuguese: Parque Natural do Faial)
 Nature Park of Flores (Portuguese: Parque Natural das Flores), Azores, Portugal
 Pakistan Netball Federation
 Penyffordd railway station, Wales, National Rail station code PNF
 Pilot not flying
 PNF stretching
 Prenex normal form, in predicate calculus
 Primary nonfunction in liver transplantation